Masters Tower Cebu is a proposed mixed-use skyscraper in Cebu City, Philippines.

History
Construction of the Masters Tower Cebu was proposed as early as December 2019, when local developer Cebu Landmasters Inc made a disclosure in the Philippine Stock Exchange that they plan to build an office-hotel building at the Cebu Business Park.

In February 2021, Cebu Landmasters in another disclosure officially launched the Masters Tower Cebu despite the COVID-19 pandemic and maintained they are expecting a "robust" recovery of the national economy in the next few years.

Groundbreaking is planned to take place in early 2021 and is projected to be complete by 2025.

Architecture and design
The Masters Tower Cebu is designed by United States-based Skidmore, Owings and Merrill along with local firm GF Partners and Architects.

The building will be erected on a  lot at the Cebu Business Park.

Tenants
The 195-room hotel, Sofitel Cebu City will be the main tenant of the Masters Tower Cebu. The building will also host office and retail spaces.

References

Proposed buildings and structures in the Philippines
Buildings and structures in Cebu City